Kseniya Mikhailovna Agafonova (born 25 June 1983) is a Russian long-distance runner.

She finished fifth in 5000 metres at the 2007 World Athletics Final. She was the 2009 winner of the Fukuoka International Cross Country meeting.

Agafonova competed at the 2009 World Championships in Athletics and she finished 15th in the 10,000 metres final. She closed the year with an appearance at the 2009 IAAF World Athletics Final.

Personal bests
1500 metres - 4:11.10 min (2006)
3000 metres - 8:53.30 min (2007)
5000 metres - 15:23.17 min (2007)
10,000 metres - 31:47.14 min (2007)

References

External links

1983 births
Living people
Russian female long-distance runners
Universiade medalists in athletics (track and field)
Universiade gold medalists for Russia
Medalists at the 2007 Summer Universiade